NBA Ballers: Chosen One is a video game for the PlayStation 3 and Xbox 360. It is the sequel to NBA Ballers: Phenom.

NBA Ballers: Chosen One allows players to live the life of an NBA superstar. The game features competitive combo and super-move systems.

Gameplay
When playing, your performance determines the evolution of your career as a basketball player and as a superstar. The game features new moves to the series, such as "Shut 'Em Down" super moves and Act-A-Fool combos. The game can be played single-player, multi-player and online play, with options to play 1-v-1, 2-v-2 or 1-v-1-v-1 matches. As well as online play, downloadable content is available and features over 500 new items including players. Hip-hop legend Chuck D calls the play-by-play action while hip-hop producer Just Blaze created over 30 custom tracks for the game. The gameplay itself, however, has taken a more realistic approach this time, as the 'Baller On Fire' and 'Bring Down the House' abilities from the first two games do not return in Chosen One.

Reception

The game received "mixed" reviews on both platforms according to the review aggregation website Metacritic.

References

External links
 

2008 video games
Midway video games
National Basketball Association video games
PlayStation 3 games
Xbox 360 games
Video games developed in the United States